Beloesthes megabasoides is a species of beetle in the family Cerambycidae, the only species in the genus Beloesthes.

References

Acanthocinini